Clarion Augustine Youmans (October 14, 1847 – July 9, 1906) was a member of the Wisconsin State Senate.

Life
Youmans was born in Kenosha, Wisconsin. He later lived in Arlington, Wisconsin, Poynette, Wisconsin and Neillsville, Wisconsin. In 1877, he married Nettie French. They had three children. He worked in farming and in the general store. In 1875, he studied law at the University of Wisconsin Law School and was admitted to the Wisconsin Bar. He practiced law with Merritt Clarke Ring in Neillsville, Wisconsin. He also served as Clark County, Wisconsin county judge. Youmans owned a farm in Clark County. He died on July 9, 1906 in Neillsville, Wisconsin.

Career
Youmans was a member of the Senate from 1895 to 1897. He was a Republican.

References

Politicians from Kenosha, Wisconsin
People from Poynette, Wisconsin
People from Neillsville, Wisconsin
University of Wisconsin Law School alumni
Wisconsin lawyers
Wisconsin state court judges
Republican Party Wisconsin state senators
1847 births
1906 deaths
People from Arlington, Wisconsin
19th-century American politicians
19th-century American judges